Rajkumar Patil (Rajkumar Patil Telkur, born 5 July 1977) is an Indian politician and a Member of the Legislative Assembly  from the Sedam constituency Karnataka. Chairman of N.E.K.R.T.C., President of D.C.C Bank Kalaburgi and Yadgiri.

Life and education
Rajkumar Patil  was born in Telkur, Sedam taluka Kalaburagi. He went to the government school at Telkur and then came to Sedam to complete his BA  from Nrupatunga Degree College Sedam.

Positions
Patil  contested as BJP candidate and lost in 2004, 2008 and 2013 assembly elections from Sedam constituency Karnataka. Patil in 2018 Assembly elections, from Sedam constituency won against Sharan Prakash Patil Congress candidate, by margin of 7200 votes.

References

Bharatiya Janata Party politicians from Karnataka
Living people
People from Kalaburagi
Karnataka MLAs 2018–2023
1977 births